Central State Hospital Chapel is a historic chapel located on the grounds of Central State Hospital near Petersburg, Dinwiddie County, Virginia. It was built in 1904, and is a simple, 1 1/2-story brick structure measuring 80 by 50 feet, with a front gable roof and Late Gothic Revival details.  The building features lancet window openings.

It was listed on the National Register of Historic Places in 2010, and was removed from the National Register in 2017.

References

Properties of religious function on the National Register of Historic Places in Virginia
National Register of Historic Places in Dinwiddie County, Virginia
Churches completed in 1904
Gothic Revival church buildings in Virginia
Buildings and structures in Dinwiddie County, Virginia
Former National Register of Historic Places in Virginia